The Cologne Tower is a 44-storey office skyscraper in the Köln-Neustadt-Nord district of Cologne, Germany that stands  high, or , including its antenna. Construction of the tower lasted from June 1999 to November 2001. It is the second-tallest building in the city (after the Cathedral), the second-tallest in North Rhine-Westphalia (after the Post Tower in Bonn), and the twelfth-tallest in Germany. The Cologne Cathedral is considered a building in Cologne but outside of North-Rhine-Westphalia due to the canon law of the Catholic Church.

Because of the tower's location near Cologne's MediaPark, it is home to several media sector companies.

The observation deck and restaurant, located on the 30th floor, were opened to the public in June 2006.

Architecture 
The reinforced concrete building was built in cooperation between the architectural firm Kohl & Kohl and Parisian architect Jean Nouvel. It contains a suspended centre core and the edge between floors to Pendelstützen. The floor plan of the tower is divided into three areas, with an  mast to the upper end.

The glass facade of the building was designed with reflected light in mind. Pictures of the Cologne Cathedral and the skyline of Cologne's Old Town were applied to the glass via screen-printing. Depending on light exposure, different combinations of these images appear on the building.

Transmitter 
From the antenna on top of the tower, three FM frequencies are broadcast mainly for the northern districts of Cologne: 98.6 MHz/0.4 kW WDR 2 Regionalfenster Cologne, 87.6 MHz/0.3 kW WDR Eins Live, and 89.9 MHz/0.03 kW Germany Kultur. Despite the low power levels, the height of the antenna allows all frequencies to transmit to the northern suburbs. In 2002, the Cologne Tower replaced the former FM transmitter site on the nearby Hansahochaus on Hansaring.

See also 
 List of tallest buildings in Germany

References

External links 

 

Buildings and structures in Cologne
Skyscrapers in Cologne
Jean Nouvel buildings
Tourist attractions in Cologne
Skyscraper office buildings in Germany
Office buildings completed in 2001